András Bozóki (born 23 January 1959) is a Hungarian sociologist and politician who served as Minister of National Cultural Heritage between 2005 and 2006.

External links
 Curriculum vitae

1959 births
Living people
Culture ministers of Hungary
Academic staff of Central European University